The Shell Seekers is a 2006 mini-series starring Academy Award-winners, Vanessa Redgrave and Maximilian Schell. The British-German co-production was directed by Piers Haggard. It is an adaptation of Rosamunde Pilcher's 1987 novel of the same name and premiered on Germany's ZDF on 25 December 2006. It was screened in the United States on the Hallmark Channel on 3 May 2008.

Plot
Set in the 1980s, Penelope (Redgrave) is seen to be recovering from a heart attack. Through a series of flashbacks, we learn she is the daughter of Lawrence (Schell), an acclaimed painter. Her children attempt to convince her to sell her father's paintings and ease their financial burdens. As Penelope continues to recover she reflects on her life, as a disillusioned wife and briefly enthralled lover. She embarks on a trip to the Mediterranean where she encounters Antonia (Stumph), whom she meets up with later on in the book, who becomes a woman in the grip of a passionate romance, something Penelope realises she briefly enjoyed.

Cast
Vanessa Redgrave as Penelope Keeling
Maximilian Schell as Lawrence Sterne
Sebastian Koch as Cosmo König
Victoria Hamilton as Nancy Chamberlaine
Stephanie Stumph as Antonia König
Victoria Smurfit as Olivia Keeling
Charles Edwards as Noel Keeling
Alastair Mackenzie as Richard
Prunella Scales as Dolly Keeling
Richard Hope as George Chamberlaine
Toby Fisher as Ambrose Keeling
Cherith Mellor as Mrs. Plackett
Hugh Sachs as Roy Brookner

Production
The mini-series was shot in 2005 in a range of locations such as Cornwall, London and Wales.

Reception
Variety made comparisons between the series and Redgrave's 2007 film, Atonement. The magazine praised her casting, as Redgrave "delivers a fine, flinty performance". It concluded that "the melancholy ending caps it with a satisfying exclamation point."

Redgrave was awarded Best Actress in a Television Film at the Shanghai International TV Festival.

References

External links
 

2006 films
2006 television films
2006 drama films
German drama films
German television films
2000s British television miniseries
2000s German television miniseries
2000s English-language films
English-language German films
2000s German-language films
English-language television shows
German-language television shows
Films set in the 1980s
Films shot in London
Films shot in Wales
Films based on British novels
Television shows based on British novels
ZDF original programming
2000s British films
2000s German films
British drama television films